Enterprises in the Soviet Union were legal entities engaged in some kind of economic activity, such as production, distribution, the provision of services, or any other economic operation. An enterprise was the general equivalent of "company", which was the legal entity prominent outside of the Eastern-bloc economies. Enterprises and production units engaged in activities that are generally undertaken by business-enterprises in capitalist systems, including the design, production, manufacture and distribution of producer and consumer goods and services. In contrast to business enterprises, enterprises and production associations did not engage in business-related activities such as marketing, buying-and-selling and financial decisions.

An enterprise often included production units. There also existed associations of production units collectively called "production associations" and "scientific production associations", organized around the production and distribution of a single sector or product. An example of a production association was the Kazan Aircraft Production Association.

The generic term for economic units in the Soviet Union was "предприятие", or "enterprise".

With the exception of the brief period of New Economic Policy, the Kosygin reform and the final period of perestroika before the dissolution of the Soviet Union, the terms company, business, corporation, etc., were considered to be attributes of capitalism that were inapplicable to the Soviet socialist economy.

Types of enterprises
Enterprises were classified into three major categories, according to the major forms of property in the Soviet Union: 
Based on property of Soviet citizens
Individual enterprises
Family enterprises
Based on collective property
Collective enterprises
Consumer cooperatives
Production cooperatives
Various incorporated businesses: partnerships, joint-stock companies, etc.
Enterprises of public (общественные) or religious (религиозные) organizations
Based on state property
Union state enterprises
Republican state enterprises
Communal state enterprises

There were also other types:
Mixed enterprises (смешанные предприятия)
Rental enterprises (арендные предприятия)
etc.

See also 
Economy of the Soviet Union
Collective ownership
Soviet-type economic planning
State enterprise
Material Product System
Planned economy
State capitalism

Economy of the Soviet Union